Ashley Woodfolk is an American writer. She is the author of the young adult books The Beauty That Remains (2018) and When You Were Everything (2020).

Career
Working full-time in marketing for a children's book publisher, Woodfolk wrote her first published book, The Beauty That Remains, on the weekends and in the evenings. The book centers on three teenagers who "find courage and comfort in the aftermath of a tragic loss." It was released on March 6, 2018 and published by Penguin Random House. She used her own issues with anxiety and experiencing using music as a therapeutic tool to inform the events of the book. The book received positive critical reception. In a starred review, School Library Journal wrote, "In her debut, Woodfolk has written a lovely and introspective coming-of-age novel that fully captures the way friendship, music, family, and romance dovetail to create a young person’s identity."

Woodfolk's second YA book, When You Were Everything, was released on March 10, 2020 by Delacorte. It focuses on the dissolution of a friendship. When You Were Everything received a starred review from Publishers Weekly. In a review by Kirkus, it was described: "...Woodfolk's novel seamlessly interweaves alternating timelines while making Shakespeare relevant to teens. The author skillfully voices the pain of unexpectedly losing a close friend and explores the choice to remain open despite the risk of future heartache."

She released the first installment in the Flyy Girls series on September 1, 2020, called Lux: The New Girl.

Alongside Dhonielle Clayton, Tiffany D. Jackson, Nic Stone, Angie Thomas, and Nicola Yoon, Woodfolk authored Blackout. The book, set to release in June 2021, follows six interlinked stories about Black teen love during a power outage in New York City.

Personal life 
Woodfolk is married. She has one son (b. 2019). She received her bachelor's degree from Rutgers University.

Works 
 The Beauty That Remains, 2018, United States, Penguin Random House , 6 March 2018
 When You Were Everything, 2020, United States, Delacorte , 10 March 2020
 Lux: The New Girl, 2020, United States, Penguin , 1 September 2020

References

External links 
Official website

Year of birth missing (living people)
Living people
Rutgers University alumni
Women writers of young adult literature
21st-century American women writers
21st-century African-American women writers
21st-century African-American writers